Ornipholidotos is a genus of butterflies, commonly called glasswings or white mimics, in the family Lycaenidae. The species of this genus are endemic to the Afrotropical realm.

Species
 Ornipholidotos abriana Libert, 2005
 Ornipholidotos ackeryi Libert, 2000
 Ornipholidotos amieti Libert, 2005
 Ornipholidotos annae Libert, 2005
 Ornipholidotos aureliae Libert, 2005
 Ornipholidotos ayissii Libert, 2005
 Ornipholidotos bakotae Stempffer, 1962
 Ornipholidotos bitjeensis Stempffer, 1957
 Ornipholidotos boormani Libert, 2005
 Ornipholidotos carolinae Libert, 2005
 Ornipholidotos congoensis Stempffer, 1964
 Ornipholidotos dargei Libert, 2000
 Ornipholidotos dowsetti Collins & Larsen, 2000
 Ornipholidotos ducarmei Libert, 2005
 Ornipholidotos emarginata (Hawker-Smith, 1933)
 Ornipholidotos etoumbi Stempffer, 1967
 Ornipholidotos evoei Libert, 2005
 Ornipholidotos francisci Libert, 2005
 Ornipholidotos gabonensis Stempffer, 1947
 Ornipholidotos gemina Libert, 2000
 Ornipholidotos ghesquierei Libert, 2005
 Ornipholidotos ginettae Libert, 2005
 Ornipholidotos goodgerae Libert, 2000
 Ornipholidotos henrii Libert, 2000
 Ornipholidotos irwini Collins & Larsen, 1998
 Ornipholidotos issia Stempffer, 1969
 Ornipholidotos ivoiriensis Libert, 2005
 Ornipholidotos jacksoni Stempffer, 1961
 Ornipholidotos jax Collins & Larsen, 1998
 Ornipholidotos jolyana Libert, 2005
 Ornipholidotos josianae Libert, 2005
 Ornipholidotos katangae Stempffer, 1947
 Ornipholidotos kelle Stempffer, 1967
 Ornipholidotos kennedyi Libert, 2005
 Ornipholidotos kirbyi (Aurivillius, 1895)
 Ornipholidotos kivu Collins & Larsen, 2000
 Ornipholidotos latimargo (Hawker-Smith, 1933)
 Ornipholidotos likouala Stempffer, 1969
 Ornipholidotos maesseni Libert, 2005
 Ornipholidotos mathildae Libert, 2000
 Ornipholidotos michelae Libert, 2000
 Ornipholidotos muhata (Dewitz, 1886)
 Ornipholidotos nancy Collins & Larsen, 2000
 Ornipholidotos nbeti Libert, 2005
 Ornipholidotos nguru Kielland, 1987
 Ornipholidotos nigeriae Stempffer, 1964
 Ornipholidotos ntebi (Bethune-Baker, 1906)
 Ornipholidotos nympha Libert, 2000
 Ornipholidotos onitshae Stempffer, 1962
 Ornipholidotos oremansi Libert, 2005
 Ornipholidotos overlaeti Stempffer, 1947 – Overlaet's glasswing
 Ornipholidotos paradoxa (Druce, 1910)
 Ornipholidotos perfragilis (Holland, 1890)
 Ornipholidotos peucetia (Hewitson, 1866) – large glasswing, white mimic
 Ornipholidotos sylpha (Kirby, 1890)
 Ornipholidotos sylphida (Staudinger, 1892)
 Ornipholidotos sylviae Libert, 2005
 Ornipholidotos tanganyikae Kielland, 1983
 Ornipholidotos teroensis Stempffer, 1957
 Ornipholidotos tessmani Libert, 2005
 Ornipholidotos tiassale Stempffer, 1969
 Ornipholidotos tirza (Hewitson, 1873)
 Ornipholidotos ugandae Stempffer, 1947

References

 Libert, M. (2000) Le genre Ornipholidotos Bethune-Baker au Cameroun. Descriptions du genre Torbenia n. gen. et de onze nouvelles espèces (Lepidoptera, Lycaenidae). Bulletin de la Société Entomologique de France 105 (5):433-466.
Libert, M. (2005) Révision des Ornipholidotos et Torbenia (Lepidoptera, Lycaenidae). A.B.R.I. & Lambillionea, Nairobi, Kenya & Tervuren, Belgium.
Seitz, A. Die Gross-Schmetterlinge der Erde 13: Die Afrikanischen Tagfalter. Plate XIII 61

 
Poritiinae
Taxa named by George Thomas Bethune-Baker
Lycaenidae genera